The Fans of Adult Media and Entertainment Awards (or F.A.M.E. Awards) were created in 2006 by Genesis, Adam & Eve, WantedList, Playboy Radio and AVN as a means for the general public to vote for their favorite adult film stars, directors, movies, and companies. The Awards were presented during the Erotica LA show at the Los Angeles Convention Center.

Voting consisted of two rounds of secure online voting by fans that were over the age of 18. The first round was the Nomination round, and then top five names from the first round (called the "Finalists") were forwarded to the final voting round. Winners received a teardrop-shaped Lucite trophy.

The 2006 F.A.M.E. Awards were hosted by Carmen Luvana, Tommy Gunn, and comedian/radio host "The Reverend" Bob Levy on June 24, 2006.

For the 2007 Awards, over 100,000 votes were cast, and the ceremony was held on June 23, 2007, co-hosted by Tera Patrick & Evan Stone, and streamed live on the Internet. The rules for the second round of voting were changed slightly in 2007 so that eight "Finalists" were chosen in each category to go on to the final rounding of secure online voting.

The 2008 Awards (for which fans logged nearly 104,000 online votes) were co-hosted by Jesse Jane & Randy Spears and held on June 7, 2008. During the 2008 F.A.M.E. Awards ceremony, the AVN Award for "Best Renting Title of the Year" (which went to Debbie Does Dallas... Again) was actually presented because (in the words of AVN founder Paul Fishbein) it was "really a fan award." The 2008 winner of the "Favorite Female Starlet" F.A.M.E. Award was also given a pearl Tiffany's necklace as well.

The 2009 Awards were hosted by Stormy Daniels and held on June 13, 2009, and the 2009 F.A.M.E. "Favorite Star Website" Award winner was TeraPatrick.com.

The 2010 Awards were co-hosted by Jessica Drake & Sunny Leone, and the 2010 F.A.M.E. "Favorite Porn Parody" Award winner was Batman XXX: A Porn Parody (Vivid Entertainment).

Below are the winners for 2006–10.

Winners

References

External links

  (as archived October 19, 2014)
 2006 FAME Award Nominees & Finalists
 2007 FAME Award Nominees & Finalists
 2007 FAME Award sponsors
 2008 FAME Award Nominees & Finalists
 2008 FAME Award sponsors
 2009 FAME Award Nominees & Finalists
 2009 FAME Award sponsors
 2010 F.A.M.E FINALISTS LIST

American pornographic film awards